Biswa Bangla Biswabidyalay, established in 2020, is a liberal arts university in Bolpur, Birbhum district, West Bengal. The university will impart education in different branches of liberal arts. This university is also known as Bolpur University or Biswa Bangla University.

Department
The Department of Science. (Mathematics), The Department of Languages (Bengali & English) 
& Social Science (History ).

Upcoming departments will be Social Sciences ( Economics, Political Science, Education) , Department of languages ( Hindi, Assamese, Arabic), Department of science ( Botany, Library Science, Computer Science)

See also

References

External links
https://biswabanglabiswabidyalay.org/
University Grants Commission
National Assessment and Accreditation Council

Universities and colleges in Birbhum district
Universities and colleges in West Bengal
Educational institutions established in 2020
Birbhum district
2020 establishments in West Bengal